is a Japanese former football player.

Playing career

Japan
Yoshitake attended Tsu Technical High School, where he was selected to the prefecture's select team to take part in a tournament in Brazil. He began his professional career in the Winter of 2000 when he joined Yokohama FC, for whom he scored nine goals in his 133 appearances over the course of six years and became the fans' favorite player before being transferred to Tokyo Verdy. During his one year in the Japanese Capital city injury limited him to playing only five times, scoring one goal.

United States
On March 24, 2009 Yoshitake left Tokyo Verdy and completed a move to the Charleston Battery of the USL First Division in the United States. Given the #10, and on April 24, 2009, during his home debut, he scored his first goal for the Battery from the penalty spot to tie up their game with Minnesota Thunder. The game finished 1-1. For his rookie year, he was in charge of all set pieces for the team, scoring 6 goals, and 5 assists. He also earned the Weekly Honors 5 times during this season, and was given the team's "New Comer of the Year" award.
Yoshitake announced his move to Crystal Palace Baltimore in February, 2010, and again was given the #10 as the team's ace attacker. In a 2012 match against the MN Stars on July 16, Yoshitake scored a critical goal in the late first half, catching the Stars defense sleeping. The goal happened to be a game changer, as the Rowdies won 2-1.

In September 2010 Austin Aztex, who was preparing for the Playoffs, acquired Yoshitake from Baltimore on loan for the remainder of the season. His New Jersey number was 9.

Yoshitake signed a two-year contract with FC Tampa Bay of the North American Soccer League on February 16, 2011. Yoshitake played in 40 matches during his Tampa Bay career. He scored seven goals and totaled five assists during his two seasons there, and also earned NASL Player of the Month for June, 2012.

Hong Kong
However, announced his move to Yokohama FC Hong Kong during the season on August 4, 2012, and serves as the team captain. Yoshitake had a superb debut season recording 9 goals.  He finished fifth place in the league and was voted to the Hong Kong All Star XI for the 2013 Lunar New Year Cup squad, and also the league's Best XI.  On June 4, 2014, Yoshitake announced his signing with Yuen Long FC in the same league.
On June 12, 2015, he announced his retirement on his Official Blog.

Club statistics

(1) 5 League Appierences and 2 Play-Off Appierences

(2) 25 League Appierences and 1 Play-Off Appierences

Playing style
Small in size but speedy on and off the ball, Yoshitake is able to run at defenders and take them on with high technique dribbling. Capable on both feet, he is a good creative output in the attacking third and frequently serves up dangerous crosses and can entertain the idea of an occasional long shot.  Head Coach Mike Anhaeuser described him "He's so creative and he's almost impossible to stop one-on-one. He's given us another weapon up top, someone that can really serve the ball into the box and score goals" in an interview

Honors and awards

Personal
2012-13: Hong Kong First Division - Hong Kong All Star XI for the Lunar New Year Cup 2013 squad
2012-13: Hong Kong First Division - Best XI
2012: NASL Player of the Month - June
2009: Charleston Battery Newcomer of the Year award
2009: USL1 Weekly Honor - 5 weeks
2002: Yokohama FC MVP

Team
 2007: Promotion to J1 (J2 Runner Up)- Tokyo Verdy
 2006: Promotion to J1 (Champion of J2) - Yokohama FC
 2001: Promotion to J2 (Champion of JFL) - Yokohama FC

References

External links

 Charleston Battery bio
 Crystal Palace Baltimore bio
 SOCCER TRANSITION - Made In Japan
 Tsuyoshi Yoshitake at HKFA

1981 births
Living people
Charleston Battery players
Japanese footballers
Japanese expatriate footballers
J1 League players
J2 League players
Japan Football League players
Yokohama FC players
Tokyo Verdy players
Crystal Palace Baltimore players
Austin Aztex FC players
Tampa Bay Rowdies players
USL First Division players
USSF Division 2 Professional League players
North American Soccer League players
Association football people from Mie Prefecture
Expatriate soccer players in the United States
Expatriate footballers in Hong Kong
Japanese expatriate sportspeople in the United States
Yokohama FC Hong Kong players
Yuen Long FC players
Association football midfielders
Hong Kong League XI representative players
Guangzhou City F.C. non-playing staff